The Crab with the Golden Claws is the ninth volume of The Adventures of Tintin, the comics series by Belgian cartoonist Hergé. The story tells of young Belgian reporter Tintin and his dog Snowy, who travel to Morocco to pursue a gang of international opium smugglers. The story marks the first appearance of main character Captain Haddock.

The Crab with the Golden Claws was published in book form shortly after its conclusion. Hergé continued The Adventures of Tintin with The Shooting Star, while the series itself became a defining part of the Franco-Belgian comics tradition.  In 1943, Hergé coloured and redrew the book in his distinctive  style for Casterman's republication.  The Crab with the Golden Claws introduces the supporting character Captain Haddock, who became a major fixture of the series. The book is the first Tintin adventure published in the United States and the first to be adapted into a motion picture. The Crab with the Golden Claws was adapted for the 1947 stop motion film of the same name, the 1956 Belvision Studios animation Hergé's Adventures of Tintin, the 1991 Ellipse/Nelvana animated series The Adventures of Tintin, the feature film The Adventures of Tintin: The Secret of the Unicorn (2011) directed by Steven Spielberg, and the film's tie-in video game.

Synopsis
Tintin is informed by Thomson and Thompson of a case involving a drowned sailor, found with a scrap of paper from what appears to be a tin of crab meat with the word "Karaboudjan" scrawled on it. His subsequent investigation and the kidnapping of a Japanese man interested in giving him a letter leads Tintin to a ship called the Karaboudjan, where he is abducted by a syndicate of criminals who have hidden opium in the crab tins. Tintin escapes from his locked room after Snowy chews through his bonds and encounters Captain Haddock, an alcoholic sea captain, who is manipulated by his first mate, Allan, and is unaware of his crew's criminal activities. Fooling Allan and his men, Tintin, Snowy, and Haddock escape the ship in a lifeboat after sending a radio message to the police.

Stranded at sea, a seaplane tries to attack them; Tintin and the Captain hijack the plane, tie up the pilots, and try to reach Spain. Haddock's drunken behaviour in a storm causes them to crash-land in the Sahara desert instead, where the pilots escape. After trekking across the desert and nearly dying of dehydration, Tintin and Haddock are rescued and taken to a French outpost, where they hear on the radio that the storm has sunk the Karaboudjan. They travel to Bagghar, a Moroccan port, and are attacked by Tuareg tribesmen along the way. In Bagghar, the Captain recognises the Karaboudjan disguised as another ship, but he is kidnapped by his former crewmen. Meanwhile, Tintin meets Thomson and Thompson and learn that wealthy merchant Omar Ben Salaad sells the crab tins that are used to smuggle the opium. 

While Thomson and Thompson discreetly investigate Ben Salaad, Tintin tracks down Allan and the rest of the gang and saves Captain Haddock, but they both become intoxicated by the fumes from wine barrels breached in a shootout with the villains. Haddock chases a gang-member from the cellar to an entrance behind a bookcase in Salaad's house. Upon sobering up, Tintin discovers a necklace of a crab with golden claws on the now-subdued owner of the wine cellar, Omar ben Salaad, and realizes that he is the leader of the drug cartel. Allan steals a boat and tries to escape, but Tintin captures him. The police arrest the gang and free the Japanese man, who introduces himself as Bunji Kuraki, a police detective who was trying to warn Tintin of the group he was up against. He had been investigating the sailor on Haddock's crew who drowned; the sailor was on the verge of bringing him opium before he was eliminated. Turning on the radio, Tintin learns that, thanks to him, the entire organisation of the Crab with the Golden Claws is behind bars.

History

Background

As the Belgian army clashed with the invading Germans in May 1940, Hergé and his wife fled by car to France along with tens of thousands of other Belgians, first staying in Paris and then heading south to Puy-de-Dôme, where they remained for six weeks. On 28 May, Belgian King Leopold III officially surrendered the country to the German army to prevent further killing, a move that Hergé agreed with. Germany placed Belgium under occupation. Hergé followed the king's request that all civilians who had fled the country return; he arrived back in Brussels on 30 June. There, he found that an officer of the German army's Propagandastaffel occupied his house, and he also faced financial trouble, as he owed back taxes yet was unable to access his financial reserves (his fee due from Casterman eventually arrived). All Belgian publications were now under the control of the German occupying force. The Catholic publication  and its supplement , where Hergé had always worked serialising The Adventures of Tintin, no longer had permission to continue publication. Land of Black Gold, the story that Hergé had been serialising there, had to be abandoned.

Confiscated from its original owners, the German authorities permitted  to reopen under the directorship of Belgian editor Raymond De Becker, although it remained firmly under Nazi control, supporting the German war effort and espousing anti-Semitism. After joining  on 15 October, Hergé created its new children's supplement, . Appointed editor of this supplement, he was aided by old friend Paul Jamin and the cartoonist Jacques Van Melkebeke. ("Tintin and Snowy are Back!"). Hergé however was heavily enticed by the size of '''s readership, which reached 600,000, far more than what Le Vingtième Siècle had been able to accomplish. Faced with the reality of Nazi oversight, Hergé abandoned the overt political themes that had pervaded much of his earlier work, instead adopting a policy of neutrality. Without the need to satirise political types, Harry Thompson observed that "Hergé was now concentrating more on plot and on developing a new style of character comedy. The public reacted positively".

However, on 8 May 1941, a paper shortage caused by the ongoing war led to  being reduced to four pages, with the length of the weekly Tintin strip being cut by two-thirds. Several weeks later, on 3 September, the supplement disappeared altogether, with The Crab with the Golden Claws being moved into  itself in September, where it became a daily strip. As a result, Hergé was forced to alter the pace at which his narrative moved, as he had to hold the reader's attention at the end of every line. As with earlier Adventures of Tintin, the story was later serialised in France in the Catholic newspaper Cœurs Vaillants from 21 June 1942.

Following serialisation, Casterman collected together and published the story in book form in 1941; the last black-and-white Tintin volume to be released. Hergé became annoyed that Casterman then sent the book to the printers without his final approval. Nevertheless, as a result of 's publicity, book sales markedly increased, to the extent that most of the prior Adventures of Tintin were reprinted as a result. German authorities made two exceptions: Tintin in America and The Black Island could not be reprinted at the time because they were set in the United States and Britain respectively, both of which were in conflict with Germany.

The serial introduced the character of Captain Haddock. Haddock made his first appearance in  adjacent to an advert for the anti-Semitic German film, Jud Süß. Hergé chose the name "Haddock" for the character after his wife, Germaine Remi, mentioned "a sad English fish" during a meal. The inclusion of the Japanese police detective Bunji Kuraki as an ally of Tintin's in this story was possibly designed to counterbalance Hergé's portrayal of the Japanese as the antagonists in his earlier story, The Blue Lotus, particularly given that the occupying government was allied with Japan at the time. The use of Morocco as a setting was likely influenced by The White Squadron a novel by French writer Joseph Peyré, which had been adapted into an Italian film in 1936 (Hergé had read the novel and seen the film). The depiction of the French Foreign Legion in North Africa was possibly influenced by P. C. Wren's novel Beau Geste (1925) or its cinematic adaptations in 1926, 1928, and 1939.

Whereas Hergé's use of Chinese in The Blue Lotus was correct, the Arabic script employed in The Crab with the Golden Claws was intentionally fictitious. Many of the place names featured in the series are puns: the town of Kefheir was a pun on the French  ("what to do?") while the port of Bagghar derives from the French  (scrape, or fight). The name of Omar ben Salaad is a pun meaning "Lobster Salad" in French.

In February 1942, Casterman suggested to Hergé that his books be published in a new format; 62-pages rather than the former 100 to 130 pages, and now in full colour rather than black-and-white. He agreed to this, and in 1943 The Crab with the Golden Claws was re-edited and coloured for publication as an album in 1944. The Crab with the Golden Claws contained one of Hergé's two favourite illustrations from The Adventures of Tintin. It depicts Berbers reacting to Haddock's manic ravings, eventually becoming terrified of him and running away. Hergé described the action as "a series of movements, broken up and distributed among several characters. It could have been the same individual, lying down first, then getting up slowly, hesitating and finally running away. It's like a short cut in space and time".

In the 1960s, The Crab with the Golden Claws, along with King Ottokar's Sceptre, became the first Tintin adventures published in the United States, in Little Golden Books. Meanwhile, Casterman, working with the American publisher Western Publishing, made a number of changes: Jumbo, the sailor who Tintin leaves bound and gagged in Captain Haddock's cabin, as well as another man who beats Haddock in the cellar, could not be black Africans as depicted in the original; these were changed to a white sailor and an Arab due to the American publisher's concerns depicting blacks and whites mixing together. The accompanying text was not changed and Haddock still refers to the man who beat him as a "Negro". Also by request of the Americans, scenes of Haddock drinking directly from bottles of whiskey on the lifeboat and the plane were blanked out, keeping only the text. The edited albums later had their blanked areas redrawn by Hergé to be more acceptable, and they appear this way in published editions around the world. Casterman republished the original black-and-white version of the story in 1980, as part of the fourth volume in their  collection. In 1989, they then published a facsimile version of that first edition.

Critical analysis
Hergé biographer Benoît Peeters described the story as a "rebirth" for The Adventures of Tintin and described the addition of Haddock as "a formidable narrative element", one which "profoundly changed the spirit of the series". Elsewhere, he asserts that it is Haddock's appearance which "makes this book so memorable" and that he is tempted to define the book by that character's début. Fellow biographer Pierre Assouline commented that The Crab with the Golden Claws had "a certain charm" stemming from its use of "exoticism and colonial nostalgia, for the French especially, evoking their holdings in North Africa". Michael Farr asserted that the arrival of Haddock was the most "remarkable" element of the story, offering the series "tremendous new potential". He also thought that the dream sequences reflected the popularity of surrealism at the time, and that the influence of cinema, in particular the films of Alfred Hitchcock, is apparent in the story.

Jean-Marc Lofficier and Randy Lofficier described the story as "a thinly-disguised remake of Cigars of the Pharaoh", an Adventure of Tintin which had been first serialised in 1934. Both feature the smuggling of opium, in crab tins and cigars respectively, and "desert treks, hostile tribes and, at the end, the infiltrating of a secret underground lair". Stating that the inclusion of a Japanese detective investigating drug smuggling in the Mediterranean makes no sense within the context of 1940s Europe, they ultimately awarded the story three out of five stars.

Literary critic Jean-Marie Apostolidès of Stanford University, in a psychoanalytical review of The Crab with the Golden Claws, commented that this book witnessed Tintin's "real entrance into the community of human beings" as he gains an "older brother" in Haddock. He also believed that the recurring image of alcohol throughout the story was symbolic of sexuality. In particular, he believed that there was a strong homoerotic subtext between Haddock and Tintin, represented in the two delirious sequences; in one, Haddock envisions Tintin as a champagne bottle frothing at the top (thereby symbolising an ejaculating penis), while in the other, Tintin dreams that he is trapped inside a bottle, with Haddock about to stick a corkscrew into him (thereby symbolising sexual penetration). However, Apostolidès notes, in both instances the pair are prevented from realising their sexual fantasies. Literary critic Tom McCarthy concurred with Apostolidès on this point, also highlighting what he perceived as homoerotic undertones to these two scenes. He also noted that in this Adventure, the manner in which a chance finding of a tin can on a Belgian street leads Tintin into the story is representative of the recurring theme of "Tintin the detective" found throughout the series.

Adaptations
In 1947, the first Tintin motion picture was created: the stop motion-animated feature film The Crab with the Golden Claws, faithfully adapted by producer Wilfried Bouchery for Films Claude Misonne. It was first shown at the ABC Cinema on 11 January for a group of invited guests. It was screened publicly only once, on 21 December of that year, before Bouchery declared bankruptcy and fled to Argentina.

In 1957, the animation company Belvision Studios produced a string of colour adaptations based upon Hergé's original comics, adapting eight of the Adventures into a series of daily five-minute episodes. The Crab with the Golden Claws was the fifth such story to be adapted, being directed by Ray Goossens and written by Greg, himself a well-known cartoonist who in later years would become editor-in-chief of Tintin magazine.

In 1991, a second animated series based upon The Adventures of Tintin was produced, this time as a collaboration between the French studio Ellipse and the Canadian animation company Nelvana. Adapting 21 of the stories into a series of episodes, each 42 minutes long, with most stories spanning two episodes, The Crab with the Golden Claws was the seventh story produced in the series. Directed by Stéphane Bernasconi, critics have praised the series for being "generally faithful", with compositions having been actually directly taken from the panels in the original comic book.

A 2011 motion capture feature film directed by Steven Spielberg and produced by Peter Jackson was released in most of the world October–November 2011, under the title The Adventures of Tintin: The Secret of the Unicorn, and in the US on 21 December, where it was simply titled The Adventures of Tintin. The film is partially based on The Crab with the Golden Claws, combined with elements of The Secret of the Unicorn and Red Rackham's Treasure. A video-game tie-in to the movie was released in October 2011.

In popular culture

In The Simpsons episode "In the Name of the Grandfather" Bart Simpson makes a derogatory remark about Belgium, causing his mother Marge to threaten him with "taking his Tintins away", whereupon Bart clutches a copy of the Tintin album The Crab with the Golden Claws'' to his chest, promising he'll behave.

References

Notes

Footnotes

Bibliography

External links
The Crab with the Golden Claws at the official Tintin website
The Crab with the Golden Claws at Tintinologist.org

1941 graphic novels
1943 graphic novels
Comics set in deserts
Comics set in Morocco
Comics set in the 1940s
Literature first published in serial form
Methuen Publishing books
Nautical comics
Tintin books
Works about opium
Works originally published in Le Soir